Rosapha is a genus of flies in the family Stratiomyidae.

Species
Rosapha bicolor (Bigot, 1877)
Rosapha bimaculata Wulp, 1904
Rosapha brevispinosa Kovac & Rozkošný, 2012
Rosapha flagellicornis Enderlein, 1914
Rosapha habilis Walker, 1859
Rosapha longispina (Chen, Liang & Yang, 2010)
Rosapha obscurata Meijere, 1916
Rosapha umbripennis Lindner, 1957
Rosapha variegata Meijere, 1919
Rosapha yunnanana Chen, Liang & Yang, 2010

References

Stratiomyidae
Brachycera genera
Taxa named by Francis Walker (entomologist)
Diptera of Asia